Irina Slavina may refer to:
 Irina Slavina (journalist) (1973–2020), Russian journalist
 Irina Turova (chess player) (born 1979), née Slavina, Russian chess player